Kim Takhwan (born October 27, 1968) is a South Korean novelist and literary critic. He left the security of a tenured professorship to focus on his writing career.

Work
Almost all of Kim's novels take place in the mid to late Joseon Dynasty (1392~1910), a period when the feudal dynasty still remained unchallenged though the demand to respond to the advent of modern era was beginning to be heard. Kim is not content with mere replication of historical characters and events, but always desires that his readers discover a sense of continuum and ongoing communication between the past and the present through his works.

Indestructible, a four-volume novel about Yi Sun-sin, the famed naval general who led victorious maritime battles against Japanese invaders from 1592 to 1598, focuses on the humanistic depiction of the hero and his internal struggles. Kim expanded this novel into eight volumes and publishing it under the new title The Immortal Yi Sun-sin. Another historical novel, The Last Nineteen Days of Heo Gyun details the life of Heo Gyun, a mid-Joseon Dynasty writer, revolutionary and the author of the classic novel Tale of Hong Gildong, and at the same time conveys the sense of despair as well as fervor experienced by the intellectuals of the 1980s. In the similar manner, the sentiments expressed in Apnok River, a seven-volume novel about the life of the legendary general Im Gyeong-eop, parallels the sense of chaos that plagued the intellectuals in the 1990s as a result of the fall of the eastern block. I, Hwang Jini dramatizes the life of Hwang Jini, the famed gisaeng from the Joseon Dynasty who was also a gifted writer and an intellectual. This novel was also published in a critical edition that contains abundant annotations and supplemental texts.

Adaptations
Several of Kim's novels have adapted for the screen, including the historical television series Roll of Thunder, Immortal Admiral Yi Sun-sin, and Hwang Jini, followed by the films Detective K: Secret of the Virtuous Widow and Gabi. The film rights for his novels A Court Lady from Joseon in Paris, The Banggakbon Murder Case, and The Arrest of the Ghost by a Buyeo County Official have already been sold.

Novels (in Korean)
 The Immortal Yi Sun-sin
 The Last Nineteen Days of Heo Gyun
 Apnok River
 I, Hwang Jini
 The Secret of the Virtuous Widow
 Russian Coffee
 Sad, To Be Forgotten
 A Court Lady from Joseon in Paris
 The Banggakbon Murder Case
 The Arrest of the Ghost by a Buyeo County Official

Screen adaptations

References

External links
Kim Tak-hwan at Daum

South Korean novelists
1968 births
Living people